Uclesiella is a genus of parasitic flies in the family Tachinidae.  It is a monotypic genus, including a single species, Uclesiella irregularis Malloch, 1938

Distribution
New Zealand

References

Taxa named by John Russell Malloch
Monotypic Diptera genera
Endemic fauna of New Zealand
Diptera of Australasia
Dexiinae
Tachinidae genera
Monotypic Brachycera genera
Endemic insects of New Zealand